Malmö Live is an event centre in Malmö, Sweden. It opened in August 2015, containing a concert hall, conference facilities, a hotel, offices, and housing. Malmö Live Concert Hall is the home of the  Malmö Symphony Orchestra and can fit up to 1,600 people. The hotel and conference center Clarion Hotel & Congress Malmö Live has 25 floors with a height of 85 meters which makes it the tallest building of Malmö Live, 24 conference rooms, a congress hall for up to 1,500 participants and a skybar.  There are several other buildings around the area, holding offices and housings. Due to the appearance of several tall buildings, the area is sometimes also known as "Malmhattan". The current director of Malmö Live is Maria Frej since February 2020.  Malmö Live is hosting: symphony orchestras, commercial, cultural and political events as well as meetings.

References

External links 

 

Tourist attractions in Malmö
Buildings and structures in Malmö
Concert halls in Sweden
21st-century establishments in Skåne County
Skyscraper office buildings in Sweden